Ashoke Sen FRS (born 1956) is an Indian theoretical physicist and distinguished professor at the International Centre for Theoretical Sciences (ICTS), Bengaluru . He is also an honorary fellow in National Institute of Science Education and Research (NISER), Bhubaneswar, India and also a Morningstar Visiting professor at MIT and a distinguished professor at the Korea Institute for Advanced Study. His main area of work is string theory. He was among the first recipients of the Fundamental Physics Prize "for opening the path to the realization that all string theories are different limits of the same underlying theory".

Early life
He was born on 15 July 1956 in Kolkata, and is the elder son of Anil Kumar Sen, a former professor of physics at the Scottish Church College, Kolkata, and Gouri Sen, a homemaker.

After completing his schooling from Sailendra Sircar Vidyalaya in Kolkata, he earned his Bachelor of Science degree in 1975 from the Presidency College under the University of Calcutta, and his master's a year later from the Indian Institute of Technology Kanpur. During his undergraduate studies at Presidency, he was greatly inspired by the work and teaching of Amal Kumar Raychaudhuri. He did his doctoral work in physics at Stony Brook University.

Career
Ashoke Sen made a number of major original contributions to the subject of string theory, including his landmark paper on strong-weak coupling duality or S-duality, which was influential in changing the course of research in the field. He pioneered the study of unstable D-branes and made the famous Sen conjecture about open string tachyon condensation on such branes. His description of rolling tachyons has been influential in string cosmology. He has also co-authored many important papers on string field theory.

In 1998, he won the fellowship of the Royal Society on being nominated by the theoretical physicist Stephen Hawking. His contributions include the entropy function formalism for extremal black holes and its applications to attractors. His recent important works include the attractor mechanism and the precision counting of microstates of black holes, and new developments in string perturbation theory. He joined the National Institute of Science Education and Research (NISER), Bhubaneswar, India as an honorary professor in the School of Physical Sciences. In the year 2020, he joined Indian Institute of Science Education and Research, Bhopal (IISER Bhopal), Bhopal, Madhya Pradesh, India as a Visiting / Adjunct Professor in the department of Physics. He is currently serving as a distinguished professor at the International Centre for Theoretical Sciences (ICTS), Bengaluru where he is working on string theory. His specific research interests include S-duality, tachyon condensation, black hole entropy and superstring perturbation theory.

Honors and awards
ICTP Prize in 1989
Fellow of the Indian Academy of Sciences in 1991
S.S. Bhatnagar award in 1994
TWAS Prize 1997
Fellow of the Royal Society 1998
Fellow of the Indian National Science Academy in 1996
Padma Shri in 2001
Infosys Prize in the Mathematical Sciences, 2009
Doctor of Science (Honoris Causa), 2009, awarded by IIT Kharagpur
Doctor of Science (Honoris Causa), 2011, awarded by Bengal Engineering and Science University, Shibpur (Presently Indian Institute of Engineering Science and Technology, Shibpur )
Fundamental Physics Prize, 2012, for his work on string theory
Padma Bhushan in 2013
M.P. Birla Memorial Award in 2013
Doctor of Science (Honoris Causa), 2013, awarded by Indian Institute of Technology Bombay
Doctor of Letters (honorary), 2013, awarded by Jadavpur University
Dirac Medal in 2014

Gallery

References

External links

 
Ashoke Sen CV
"Thomson Honours Leading Indian Scientists" 

1956 births
Living people
Presidency University, Kolkata alumni
Fellows of the Indian National Science Academy
Fellows of the Royal Society
IIT Kanpur alumni
20th-century Indian physicists
Stony Brook University alumni
Indian string theorists
University of Calcutta alumni
Recipients of the Padma Shri in science & engineering
Recipients of the Padma Bhushan in science & engineering
Scottish Church Collegiate School alumni
Scientists from Kolkata
TWAS laureates
Indian theoretical physicists
Bengali physicists
Bengali scientists